Abies firma, the momi fir, is a species of fir native to central and southern Japan, growing at low to moderate altitudes of 50–1600 m.

The bark is scaly grey-brown, with resin blisters on young trees. The shoots are grooved, buff to grey-brown, glabrous or finely pubescent. They are bright green above, and greyish-green below with two broad stomatal bands. The scale bracts are exserted , triangular.

Momi fir is sometimes, but not commonly, used as an ornamental tree, particularly in warm temperate regions with hot, humid summers such as the southeastern United States. It is also used as a grafting understock for fir cultivars in these areas.

References

Gymnosperm Database

External links
Conifers Around the World: Abies firma - Momi Fir.

firma
Endemic flora of Japan
Trees of Japan
Least concern plants